The 1983 Stanley Cup playoffs, the playoff tournament of the National Hockey League (NHL) began on April 5, after the conclusion of the 1982–83 NHL season. The playoffs concluded on May 17 with the champion New York Islanders defeating the Edmonton Oilers 4–0 to win the final series four games to none and win the Stanley Cup for the fourth consecutive season. 

The 1983 Playoffs marked the first time that seven NHL teams based in Canada (Montreal, Toronto, Vancouver, Edmonton, Quebec, Winnipeg, and Calgary) all qualified for the playoffs in the same season. Since the 1967–68 expansion, all the Canadian teams have qualified for the playoffs on five other occasions – 1969 (Montreal and Toronto), 1975, 1976 and 1979 (Montreal, Toronto and Vancouver), and 1986 (the same seven as in 1983), the last time to date (as of 2022) that all active Canadian teams qualified.

In the Wales Conference, the Patrick Division champion Philadelphia Flyers were upset by the New York Rangers in the first round. The defending champion Islanders had qualified second in the Patrick Division, and defeated the Washington Capitals in the first round, and defeated the Rangers to qualify for the Conference Final. In the Adams Division, the first-place Boston Bruins defeated the Quebec Nordiques and the Buffalo Sabres (who swept the Canadiens in their opening round series) to advance to the Conference Final. In the Conference Final, the Islanders defeated Boston in six games to qualify for their fourth consecutive Cup Finals appearance.

In the Campbell Conference, the Smythe Division first seed Edmonton Oilers swept the Winnipeg Jets in the opening round, and defeated the Calgary Flames (who defeated the Vancouver Canucks three games to one in the opening round) in the Smythe Final. The Norris Champion Chicago Black Hawks defeated the St. Louis Blues three games to one and the Minnesota North Stars (who defeated the Toronto Maple Leafs three games to one in the opening round) in the Norris Final four games to one. Edmonton defeated the Norris Division champion Chicago Black Hawks in a four-game sweep in the Conference Final to advance to the Cup Finals.

Playoff seeds
The 1983 playoffs followed the format introduced in the previous season. The four teams with the best regular-season records from each of the four divisions would secure playoff berths. The division semi-finals would see the first-place club against the fourth-place team, while the second- and third-place teams faced off. The winning clubs would then meet in the division final. Home-ice advantage for these first two rounds of the playoffs would be granted to the team with the better regular-season record. Division winners would then face one another in the conference finals.

Home-ice advantage for the conference finals had been determined by coin flips prior to the start of the previous season. That event determined that home-ice advantage were granted to champions of the Adams and Smythe divisions this season. Similarly, a puck flip determined that home-ice advantage for the Stanley Cup finals would be granted to Campbell Conference champion this season.

The following teams qualified for the playoffs:

Prince of Wales Conference

Adams Division
 Boston Bruins, Adams Division champions, Prince of Wales Conference regular season champions – 110 points
 Montreal Canadiens – 98 points
 Buffalo Sabres – 89 points
 Quebec Nordiques – 80 points

Patrick Division
 Philadelphia Flyers, Patrick Division champions – 106 points
 New York Islanders – 96 points
 Washington Capitals – 94 points
 New York Rangers – 80 points

Clarence Campbell Conference

Norris Division
 Chicago Black Hawks, Norris Division champions – 104 points
 Minnesota North Stars – 96 points
 Toronto Maple Leafs – 68 points
 St. Louis Blues – 65 points

Smythe Division
 Edmonton Oilers, Smythe Division champions, Clarence Campbell Conference regular season champions – 106 points
 Calgary Flames – 78 points
 Vancouver Canucks – 75 points
 Winnipeg Jets – 74 points

Playoff bracket

Division Semifinals

Prince of Wales Conference

(A1) Boston Bruins vs. (A4) Quebec Nordiques

This was the second playoff series meeting between these two teams. This was a rematch of the previous year's Adams Division Finals, in which Quebec won in seven games.

(A2) Montreal Canadiens vs. (A3) Buffalo Sabres

This was the third playoff series meeting between these two teams. Both teams split their previous two meetings. They last met in the 1975 Stanley Cup Semifinals, in which Buffalo won in six games.

(P1) Philadelphia Flyers vs. (P4) New York Rangers

This was the fifth playoff series meeting between these two teams. Both teams have split their previous four meetings. This was a rematch of last year's Patrick Division Semifinals, in which New York won 3–1.

(P2) New York Islanders vs. (P3) Washington Capitals

This was the first playoff series meeting between these two teams.

Clarence Campbell Conference

(N1) Chicago Black Hawks vs. (N4) St. Louis Blues 

This was the fourth playoff series meeting between these two teams. Chicago won all three previous meetings. This was a rematch of last year's Norris Division Finals, in which Chicago won in six games.

(N2) Minnesota North Stars vs. (N3) Toronto Maple Leafs 

This was the second playoff series meeting between these two teams. Minnesota won the only previous meeting in the 1980 Preliminary Round in a three-game sweep.

(S1) Edmonton Oilers vs. (S4) Winnipeg Jets

This was the first playoff series meeting between these two teams.

(S2) Calgary Flames vs. (S3) Vancouver Canucks

This was the second playoff series meeting between these two teams. This was a rematch of last year's Smythe Division Semifinals, in which Vancouver won in a three-game sweep.

Division Finals

Prince of Wales Conference

(A1) Boston Bruins vs. (A3) Buffalo Sabres

This was the second playoff series meeting between the two teams. This was a rematch of last year's Adams Division Semifinals, in which Boston won 3–1.

Brad Park scored the game-winner in game seven on a slapshot off a rebound of his own shot just seconds earlier.

(P2) New York Islanders vs. (P4) New York Rangers

This was the fifth playoff series meeting between these two teams. The Islanders won three of the previous four series, including both over the past two seasons. The latter of which the Islanders won in six games in the last year's Patrick Division Finals.

Clarence Campbell Conference

(N1) Chicago Black Hawks vs. (N2) Minnesota North Stars

This was the second playoff series meeting between these two teams. This was a rematch of last year's Norris Division Semifinals, in which Chicago won in an upset 3–1.

(S1) Edmonton Oilers vs. (S2) Calgary Flames

This was the first playoff series meeting between these two teams.

Conference Finals

Prince of Wales Conference Final

(A1) Boston Bruins vs. (P2) New York Islanders

This was the second playoff series meeting between these two teams. New York won the only previous meeting in five games in the 1980 Stanley Cup Quarterfinals.

Clarence Campbell Conference Final

(S1) Edmonton Oilers vs. (N1) Chicago Black Hawks

This was the first playoff series meeting between these two teams.

Stanley Cup Finals

This was the second playoff meeting between these two teams. Their only previous meeting was in the 1981 Stanley Cup Quarterfinals, which New York won in six games. This was the Oilers' first Finals appearance in their fourth season since entering the league in 1979–80; they also became the first former WHA team to make the Finals after the NHL–WHA merger in 1979. New York made their fourth consecutive and overall Stanley Cup Finals appearance; they won in the previous year sweeping the Vancouver Canucks in four games. The Oilers became the first team to represent Edmonton in the Finals since the 1922–23 Edmonton Eskimos who were defeated by the original Ottawa Senators. New York won all three games in this year's regular season series.

Player statistics

Skaters
These are the top ten skaters based on points.

Goaltenders
This is a combined table of the top five goaltenders based on goals against average and the top five goaltenders based on save percentage, with at least 420 minutes played. The table is sorted by GAA, and the criteria for inclusion are bolded.

See also
1982–83 NHL season
List of NHL seasons
List of Stanley Cup champions

References

 

playoffs
Stanley Cup playoffs